Robert Heppenstall (born February 28, 1997) is a professional Canadian middle-distance track and field athlete. Competing for Canada at the 2015 Pan American Junior Athletics Championships, Heppenstall won silver in the men's 800 meters. A 7x All American in the 800m, Heppenstall is a two-time Canadian national champion in 800m and 1500m.

Running career
Heppenstall started participating in track and field for St. Thomas More Catholic Secondary School in Hamilton, Ontario. During his high school career he was a four-time high school track and field MVP (Most Valuable Player award), as well as four-time OFSAA gold medalist, and three-time Canadian national champion in the 800 m. Heppenstall earned Athletics Ontario Distance Athlete of the Year honors in 2014 and 2015

Heppenstall competed in Track and Field as well as Cross-Country for Wake Forest in Winston-Salem, N.C. In his freshman year Heppenstall broke the University and the ACC championships record, setting a new Canadian junior indoor 800 m record with a time of 1:47.35. 
In 2015 he became Junior Pan American Games silver medalist in the 800 m; in 2016 he finished 3rd at the 2016 IAAF World U20 Championships – Men's 800 metres. The following years, Heppenstall won bronze at the 2018 NCAA Division I Indoor Track and Field Championships as well as bronze at the 2019 Championship. 

Since turning professional, Heppenstall became two-time Canadian national champion in the 800m and 1500m (2021 and 2022).

References

External links 
 Robert Heppenstall at Athletics Canada
 The Comeback Of Robert Heppenstall on The Terminal Mile

Canadian male middle-distance runners
1997 births
Living people
Athletes from Hamilton, Ontario
21st-century Canadian people